Jonathan Johnson (born March 5, 1982) is an American middle-distance runner. He competed in the men's 800 metres at the 2004 Summer Olympics.

References

External links
 

1982 births
Living people
Athletes (track and field) at the 2004 Summer Olympics
American male middle-distance runners
Olympic track and field athletes of the United States
Place of birth missing (living people)
21st-century American people